Bank of New South Wales v The Commonwealth, also known as the Bank Nationalisation Case, is a decision of the High Court of Australia that dealt with the constitutional requirements for property to be acquired on "just terms", and for interstate trade and commerce to be free. The High Court applied an 'individual rights' theory to the freedom of interstate trade and commerce that lasted until 1988, when it was overturned in favour a 'free trade' interpretation in Cole v Whitfield.

Background
Comfortable in government after two strong election wins, the Labor government of Ben Chifley announced in 1947 its intention to nationalise private banks in Australia. To accomplish this goal the Parliament passed the Banking Act 1947. Under the Act, shares in the private banks would be owned by the Commonwealth Bank of Australia, which in turn would be owned by the Federal Government. The proposal was controversial, and the constitutional validity of the law was challenged by a number of banks, including the Bank of New South Wales, as well as the non-Labor states of Victoria, South Australia and Western Australia. The banks were represented by a formidable legal team, with the Australian incorporated banks represented by Garfield Barwick , who would later become the Chief Justice, and the United Kingdom incorporated banks represented by Kitto , who would later be appointed to the High Court, while the Commonwealth was represented by the former High Court judge H. V. Evatt .

Decision
The Court hearing lasted for a record 39 days. The summary of the parties arguments occupies 143 pages of the Commonwealth Law Report. A number of arguments were put to the Court, most of which were rejected.

However the Court declared the law invalid on four grounds, albeit by different majority of judges:
Section 92 of the Constitution, in providing that "trade, commerce, and intercourse among the States ... shall be absolutely free." conferred a positive right on the banks to engage in the business of interstate banking.
it involved the acquisition of property that was not "on just terms, contrary to section 51(xxxi) of the Constitution. The problem with acquisition arose out of the Act's sections detailing the appointment of new directors for all private banks with the power to control, manage, direct and dispose of assets of those banks. Dixon J held that this was a "circuitous device to acquire indirectly the substance of proprietary interest."
The Act, in setting up a "Court of Claims", invalidly attempted to oust the original jurisdiction of the High Court.

Aftermath

The Commonwealth government appealed the decision in the Judicial Committee of the Privy Council, in Commonwealth v Bank of New South Wales (1949). The Privy Council affirmed the High Court's decision.

At the 1949 federal election the Chifley Government lost power, ostensibly due to the problems regarding this legislation and the Court case.

This particular understanding of s 92 would remain highly influential, until it was overturned in favour a 'free trade' interpretation in Cole v Whitfield.

See also
 Constitutionalism
 Constitutional economics
 Political economy
 Rule according to higher law

References

High Court of Australia cases
Australian constitutional law
Freedom of interstate trade and commerce in the Australian Constitution cases
Acquisition of property in the Australian Constitution cases
Corporations power in the Australian Constitution cases
1948 in case law
1948 in Australian law